Cort Sivertsen Adeler (16 December 16225 November 1675), known in Denmark as Coort Sifvertsen  Adelaer, in the Netherlands as Koert Sievertsen Adelaer and in Italy as Curzio Suffrido Adelborst, was the name of honour given to Kurt Sivertsen, a Norwegian seaman, who rendered distinguished service to the Danish and Dutch navies, and also to the Republic of Venice against the Turks.

Early naval career
Cort Sivertsen was born in Brevik, Norway, the son of a shipper. At the age of fifteen he took service with the Dutch navy; in 1639 he fought under Lieutenant-Admiral Maarten Tromp at the Battle of the Downs. In 1642 he was first mate on the Grote St. Joris, a Dutch ship hired by the fleet of Venice as the San Giorgio Grande. Sivertsen called himself Adelborst in this period, a Dutch name meaning "cadet". In 1645 he became captain of the San Giorgio and entered full Venetian service. In 1650 the San Giorgio became a flagship and Sivertsen therefore flag captain. In an action against the Turkish fleet on 13 May 1654 near the Dardanelles he broke with his ship a line of Turkish galleys and sank fifteen of them; next day the Turkish garrison of Tenedos surrendered to him. For this he was knighted in the Order of Saint Mark; the Venetian senate rewarded him with an annuity of 1400 golden ducats. In 1660 he was made Vice-Admiral.

Merchant
Sivertsen had during this period maintained close connections with the Dutch Republic, his son Sivert was raised there.  In this period he changed his name to Adelaer (adelaar), Dutch for "Eagle". His son Sivert Adelaer served as a cadet on the ship of the famous Dutch Vice-Admiral Michiel de Ruyter. Retiring from Venetian service he worked from 1661 till 1663 for an Amsterdam merchant house, having a supply contract with the Admiralty of Amsterdam, one of the five Dutch admiralties. In 1665, when the Second Anglo-Dutch War threatened, he was offered a position in the Dutch navy as a Vice-Admiral, but the refused. He started a salt company together with William Davidson of Curriehill and Jonas Trellond in Denmark. After the death of the Dutch supreme commander Lieutenant-Admiral Jacob van Wassenaer Obdam in the Battle of Lowestoft Adelaer was considered for this function but again indicated that he had no interest in it.

Dutch naval operations
In 1663 Adelaer had begun working as an agent for the Danish navy, that in this period had close ties with the Dutch navy. The leading Dutch military advisors in Denmark, including Frederick Stachouwer and Volckert Schram, were recalled to the Dutch Republic because of their expertise in amphibious landings, to be employed in a planned landing on the English coast which in 1667 materialised as the Raid on the Medway. Subsequently,  Adelaer was asked to join the Danish navy as operational supreme commander, to supervise the modernisation of their fleet. In 1666 King Frederick III of Denmark personally convinced Adelaer by offering him a considerable commission. While in the Dutch Navy any commoner could be appointed in the highest positions, in Denmark it was still mandatory to be of nobility to command, so Adelaer became the Danish Knight Coort Sifvertsen Adelaer in order to become Admiral-General.

During Adelaer's command the navy was expanded with thirty new ships-of-the-line. In the years 1669 and 1670 he headed a diplomatic mission to South-India to establish trade relations with Coromandel. Adeler acquired a substantial private capital and owned among others estates Dragsholm in Denmark and Gjemsø Kloster and Bratsberg near the city of Skien in Norway.

Later life
Adelaer was a personal friend of the new Dutch supreme commander Lieutenant-Admiral Michiel de Ruyter who also had been knighted in Denmark, for his victory over Sweden in 1659. A large part of their correspondence in Dutch has survived. In 1675 Denmark joined the Dutch in the Franco-Dutch War; Sweden then declared war. Adelaer commanded a single minor action against the Swedish fleet — the only time he would actually fight in Danish service — but during an epidemic that swept Scandinavia that Fall, Adelaer was afflicted and died after many weeks of suffering on 5 November 1675 at Copenhagen. He was replaced as supreme commander on 8 May 1676 by a Dutch Admiral, Cornelis Tromp.

Personal life

Adelaer was first married in 1656 in Hoorn (Netherlands) with Angelica Sophronia (died before 1661) and secondly in 1662 in Amsterdam with Anna Pelt (1640–1692). He was the father of Sivert Adeler (16??–1683) and Frederik Christian Adeler (1668–1726). Descendants of Cort Adeler became members of a Danish noble family when Admiral Cort Adeler was converted into position of nobility on 7 February 1666. Cort Adeler's older son, Sivert Cortsen Adeler was a Danish naval officer. His younger son, Frederik Christian von Adeler was a Danish Councilor and Prefect in Zealand Diocese and his grandson, Frederik Adeler (1700-1766) was a Dano-Norwegian government official and landowner, who served as a County Governor of several counties in Norway and Denmark. Members of the family have been associated with a number of Danish estates including Ulstrup Slot. The Cort Adeler House, Cort Adeler's former home in Copenhagen, located at Strandgade 22 in Christianshavn, and is a listed building.

Legacy
During the period of romantic nationalism in the 19th century, Adelaer gained the status of Norwegian naval hero, largely due his appearance in a novel by the romantic Danish writer Bernhard Severin Ingemann. Several Norwegian towns, among which the city of Oslo, have a street called Cort Adelers gate.

The street Cort Adelers Gade in Copenhagen's Gammelholm neighbourhood was named after Cort Adeler in the 1860s. Cort Adelers Gade in Aarhus was named after him in 1901.

References

Other sources

Holck, Preben Cort Adeler (Copenhagen:  1934)
Bruun, Christian  Curt Sivertsen Adelaer  (Copenhagen: 1871)
Aas, L. Cort Adeler. Den norske sjøhelt (Oslo, 1943)

External links
Adelar Lineage

1622 births
1675 deaths
Norwegian admirals
Norwegian sailors
17th-century Norwegian people
Admirals of the navy of the Dutch Republic
Royal Dano-Norwegian Navy personnel
People from Porsgrunn
Burials at the Church of Our Lady, Copenhagen
Adeler family